Wendy Anne Bergen (January 3, 1956 – April 26, 2017) was a double Emmy award-winning television journalist.

Bergen was raised in Greenwich, Connecticut, and graduated from the University of Utah. She began her television career as a weather reporter in Lake Placid, New York.

In 1983, Bergen joined KCNC-TV and became a star reporter for the station.

In 2017, Bergen died of a brain aneurysm.

Blood Sport
In the spring of 1990, Bergen made a documentary called Blood Sport where she claimed there was an underground network of pitbulls involved in dogfighting in Denver. But she secretly staged dogfights to make footage for the documentary. Debra Saunders of the San Francisco Chronicle was one of the first journalists to question her account alongside Rocky Mountain News. Bergen was pressured to resign on September 6, 1990, when her deception was discovered. She was later found guilty of staging dogfighting but not for perjury. She later had to pay a $20,000 fine.

References

1955 births
2017 deaths
Hoaxes in the United States
Journalistic hoaxes
People from Greenwich, Connecticut
American television reporters and correspondents
Deaths from intracranial aneurysm
Neurological disease deaths in the United States
American television news anchors
Emmy Award winners
University of Utah alumni
Journalists from Connecticut
American people convicted of cruelty to animals
American female criminals
20th-century American philanthropists